The 1868 United States presidential election in Ohio was held on November 3, 1868 as part of the 1868 United States presidential election. State voters chose 21 electors to the Electoral College, who voted for president and vice president.

Ohio was won by the Republican Party candidate, Ohio native and General Ulysses S. Grant, who won the state with 54.00% of the popular vote. The Democratic Party candidate, Horatio Seymour, garnered 46.00% of the popular vote.

Results

Results by county

See also
 United States presidential elections in Ohio

References

Ohio
1868
1868 Ohio elections